Genevieve Springston Lynch (1891–1960), also known as Gene Lynch, was an American painter and art teacher who taught and worked in Hawaii.

Background
Genevieve Springston was born in Forest Grove, Oregon on September 20, 1891. She studied art at the Pratt Institute in New York and at an art school in Chicago. She taught art at Punahou School, a private school in Honolulu, both before and following her marriage to L. L. Lynch, an executive with Lewers & Cooke, Ltd.

Career

Lynch was invited to have a solo show in Paris in 1935. Because of prejudice against female artists, she shortened her professional name and signature to "Gene Lynch". She exhibited in the 1939 Society of Independent Artists show. When Genevieve and her husband retired, they moved to Palo Alto, California, where she continued to paint until her death in 1960.

She is considered to be one of the notable artists of Hawaii that created "distinctly Hawaiian" art, while also using western approaches or materials. Genevieve Springston Lynch is best known for her stylized paintings of exotic plants, such as Cup-and-Saucer Flowers in the collection of the Honolulu Museum of Art.

Footnotes

Further reading
 
 
 
 
 

American women painters
Artists from Hawaii
1891 births
1960 deaths
Painters from Oregon
20th-century American painters
20th-century American women artists